Grailyn Hewitt "Grailey" Berryhill (August 17, 1896 – January 10, 1976) was an American football player, physician, and politician. He was a star running back for Dan McGugin's Vanderbilt Commodores of Vanderbilt University. He scored six touchdowns in the 76 to 0 win over Tennessee in 1918, and was captain-elect for 1921. Berryhill received one  of the school's highest honors that a student could achieve, the "Bachelor of Ugliness." He was also a three-term member of the Tennessee General Assembly.

Early years
Grailey Berryhill was born on August 17, 1896 in McKenzie, Tennessee to Adam Douglas Berryhill and Harriett Costen.

Vanderbilt
When Berryhill did not return to the 1921 Vanderbilt Commodores football team, sports writer Ferguson "Fuzzy" Woodruff wrote "While prospects seem fair to middling in most of the big southern colleges, there are two notable exceptions. Dan McGugin expects nothing of Vanderbilt this year. Dan has lost Berryhill, his only reliable backfield man, through the matrimonial route."

Berryhill graduated with an MD from Vanderbilt University in 1921.

References

External links

1896 births
1976 deaths
American football halfbacks
Vanderbilt Commodores football players
Vanderbilt University School of Medicine alumni
Players of American football from Tennessee
Tennessee Republicans
Tennessee Democrats
Members of the Tennessee House of Representatives
Physicians from Tennessee
All-Southern college football players
20th-century American politicians
People from McKenzie, Tennessee